Claude Confortès (28 February 1928 – 15 June 2016)  was a French director for stage and film and actor. As an actor, he starred in Yves Robert's War of the Buttons (La Guerre des boutons) in 1962, and played a supporting role in Germinal in 1993.

References

External links
 

1928 births
2016 deaths
People from Saint-Maur-des-Fossés
French film directors
French theatre directors
French male film actors
20th-century French dramatists and playwrights